The women's 400 metres event at the 1988 Summer Olympics in Seoul, South Korea had an entry list of 48 competitors. The final was run on Monday September 26, 1988, in the Seoul Olympic Stadium.

Records
These were the standing world and Olympic records (in seconds) prior to the 1988 Summer Olympics.

The following Olympic record was set during this competition.

Final

Semifinals

Quarter-finals

Qualifying heats

See also
 1987 Women's World Championships 400 metres (Rome)
 1990 Women's European Championships 400 metres (Split)
 1991 Women's World Championships 400 metres (Tokyo)
 1992 Women's Olympic 400 metres (Barcelona)

References

External links
  Official Report

4
400 metres at the Olympics
1988 in women's athletics
Women's events at the 1988 Summer Olympics